G. M. Fazlul Haque is a Bangladesh Nationalist Party politician and the former Member of Parliament of Chandpur-3.

Career
Haque was elected to parliament from Chandpur-3 as a Bangladesh Nationalist Party candidate in 2001.

References

Bangladesh Nationalist Party politicians
Living people
8th Jatiya Sangsad members
People from Chandpur District
7th Jatiya Sangsad members
Year of birth missing (living people)